The Hits – Chapter One, also known as Greatest Hits – Chapter One internationally, is the first greatest hits album released by American boy band, the Backstreet Boys. The album features 15 songs by the group, as well as a new song, "Drowning". "Drowning" was the album's only single, peaking at number four on the UK Singles Chart and charting in the top 10 in several countries.

A video album, featuring all of the videos from the release, was made available around the same time as the album. It peaked at number four on the US Billboard 200 chart and was certified platinum by the Recording Industry Association of America (RIAA). It was also their second album to reach number four in the US following Backstreet Boys in 1997, and their fourth consecutive top-ten album in the US following Black & Blue in 2000. The album sold over 6 million copies worldwide.

Background
The Backstreet Boys' label, Jive Records, decided to release a Backstreet Boys greatest-hits CD by Christmas 2001 as they had not released a blockbuster album that year. The group resisted the release as they felt that it was too early in their career for such an album and that it would ruin their plan to mark the group's 10th anniversary in 2003 with a greatest-hits release. Band member Kevin Richardson said, "Our management company was supportive and we weren't. And the record company was going to put it out anyway. So it's either promote, or fight with your label, don't promote it and risk it doing very badly. But ultimately, who is it that's going to get hurt? It's not going to hurt our label. It's going to hurt us." Jive ultimately released the album after a long debate, despite threats from the group.

Reviews
 AllMusic  [ link]
 Blender  link

Commercial performance
The Hits – Chapter One debuted and peaked at number four on the US Billboard 200 the week of November 17, 2001. With 197,000 copies sold, it was a skimpy sales debut after the bands' last two albums debuted with more than one million copies. The album remained on the chart for a total of twenty-five weeks. On September 19, 2002, The Hits – Chapter One was certified platinum by the Recording Industry Association of America (RIAA) for shipments of over one million copies. As of June 2011, the album has sold 1,834,000 copies in the United States according to Nielsen SoundScan.

In the United Kingdom the album debuted and peaked at number five on November 10, 2001, staying there for a week. The album remained on the chart for nineteen weeks. It was certified platinum by the BPI on November 30, 2001, denoting shipments of 300,000 units.

The album was the 13th best-selling album of 2001, with 5 million copies shipped worldwide in that year according to the International Federation of the Phonographic Industry (IFPI). To date it sold over 6 million copies worldwide.

Track listing

Charts

Weekly charts

Year-end charts

Certifications

}}

References

2001 greatest hits albums
Backstreet Boys albums